Coenraad Lodewyk Breytenbach (born 10 November 1970) is a South African former rugby union and rugby league footballer who played in the 1990s and 2000s. He represented South Africa at rugby league in the 2000 Rugby League World Cup and Russia in rugby union.

Background
He was born in Middelburg, South Africa.

Playing career
Breytenbach played rugby union for the Northern Transvaal Blue Bulls and was tipped to eventually play for the South Africa (RU).

Between 1996 and 1998 Breytenbach played for the Northern Transvaal Bulls in the Super 12 competition.

In 2000, Breytenbach was part of the South African squad at the Rugby League World Cup. He played in one match at five eighth, scoring a try against Tonga.

In 2001 Breytenbach played for the Blue Bulls in the Currie Cup.

In 2002 he played in a European Nations Cup match for Russia (RU) against Georgia along with two other South African born players, sparking a protest from Georgia.

References

1970 births
Living people
Blue Bulls players
Bulls (rugby union) players
Dual-code rugby internationals
Rugby league five-eighths
Rugby league players from Mpumalanga
People from Middelburg, Mpumalanga
Rugby union centres
Rugby union players from Middelburg, Mpumalanga
Rugby union scrum-halves
Russia international rugby union players
Russian rugby union players
South Africa international rugby sevens players
South Africa national rugby league team players
South African rugby league players
South African rugby union players